Ediz Yıldırımer (born 25 October 1993) is a Turkish freestyle swimmer competing particularly in the 800 m and 1500 m events. He represented his country at the 2008 Summer Olympics without advancing to the final. With his age of 14, he was the youngest ever Turkish athlete to take part at the Olympics.

Early years
Born at Gölcük in Kocaeli Province, he began swimming at the age of six in Konya, where his family moved after the 1999 İzmit earthquake. He became there a member of Konya Firuze Swim Club, and was mentored in swimming techniques. Two years later, Yıldırımer returned to Kocaeli to join the cadets team.

Career
In 2003, Yıldırımer set a national record in 100 m freestyle of his age category at the Turkish Swimming Championships that was his first competition at national level.

He accepted a scholarship offer from Tim Bauer, The Woodlands Swim Team's head coach. In 2009, he went to the United States as a foreign exchange student, and continued his high school education there. He graduated 2012 from the John Cooper School in The Woodlands, Texas. During this time, he was a member of the school team and set many records and reached to a lot of swimming accomplishments.

Yıldırımer won the gold medal in the 800 m event and the bronze medal in the 1500 m at the 2010 European Junior Swimming Championships held in Helsinki, Finland. In 2011, he repeated the same success at the European Junior Championships held in Belgrade, Serbia.

He was invited to participate in the 1500 m freestyle event at the 2012 Summer Olympics.

Achievements

References

1993 births
Living people
Turkish male freestyle swimmers
Olympic swimmers of Turkey
Swimmers at the 2008 Summer Olympics
People from Gölcük
Swimmers at the 2012 Summer Olympics
Georgia Bulldogs men's swimmers
Swimmers at the 2013 Mediterranean Games
Mediterranean Games competitors for Turkey
Competitors at the 2015 Summer Universiade
21st-century Turkish people
20th-century Turkish people